Convoy QP 10 was an Arctic convoy of World War II, consisting of empty merchant ships returning from the Soviet Union after delivering their cargo there.  The convoy consisted of 16 merchant ships and an escort of nine warships. The convoy departed Murmansk on 10 April 1942 and arrived in Reykjavik on 21 April. The convoy was attacked by German U-boats and aircraft, resulting in the loss of four merchant ships. Another ship, was damaged by air attack and forced to turn back to the Kola Inlet. The convoy's escorts shot down six German planes and damaged another during the course of the voyage.  Later, six merchant ships from Convoy PQ 14 joined QP 10.

Ships
QP 10 consisted of 16 merchant ships. During the voyage, six ships from the Britain-to-Russia convoy PQ 14 joined QP 10 after turning back due to ice and weather damage. The convoy was escorted by the cruiser HMS Liverpool, the destroyers HMS Oribi, Punjabi, Fury, Eclipse, and Marne, the minesweeper Speedwell, and the trawlers Blackfly and Paynter. From 10 April to 12 April the escort was augmented by the Soviet destroyers Gremyashchi and Sokrushitelny and the minesweepers Gossamer, Harrier and Hussar. Between Iceland and Norway a distant covering force was present, consisting of the battleships Duke of York and King George V, the aircraft carrier Victorious, the cruisers Kent and Nigeria, and 12 destroyers, though this force was too far away from the convoy to defend it against submarine and air attacks.

Voyage

QP 10 departed Murmansk at 17:00 on 10 April. The first attack on the convoy came on 11 April. Several German Ju 88 bombers appeared overhead, and attacked the convoy. The merchant ship Empire Cowper was hit by three 500 lb bombs and then two more bombs as the ship was being evacuated. HMS Paynter rescued survivors from Empire Cowper, which then sank. The merchant ship Harpalion shot down one of the attacking Ju 88s.  On 12 April, the German destroyers Hermann Schoemann, Z24 and Z25 set out to search for the convoy, but failed to find it.

At 01:00 in the morning of 13 April, the convoy was attacked by the German U-boat . The Russian freighter Kiev was hit by the U-boat's first torpedo and sunk. At 03:30,  struck again, hitting  which sank almost immediately. At around 05:00, more Ju 88s appeared and circled the convoy for about an hour before attacking. Harpalion came under repeated air attack that damaged her steering gear and broke her rudder. The crew of Harpalion tried to jury-rig a rudder, but their attempts were halted by four Ju 88s that strafed the ship's deck with machine guns.  Finally, Harpalion was scuttled by shells from HMS Fury. Also on 13 April Hermann Schoemann, Z24 and Z25 made another attempt to look for the convoy, but turned back due to poor weather.

The convoy was not attacked again. Later in the voyage, the convoy was joined by six ships from convoy PQ 14 that turned around due to ice and weather damage.

References

QP 10
Naval battles of World War II involving Germany
Naval battles of World War II involving the United Kingdom